The Siewert-Stein classification (often called the Siewert classification in less precise shorthand reference) is a system of anatomical classification used for adenocarcinomas of the esophagogastric junction.

Classifications

Type I
Adenocarcinoma of the distal part of the esophagus. The tumor center is located 1–5 cm above the gastric cardia.

Type II
Adenocarcinoma of the real cardia. The tumor center is located 1 cm above or 2 cm below the gastric cardia. Considered to be true gastroesophageal junction.

Type III
Adenocarcinoma of the subcardial stomach. The tumor center is located 2–5 cm below the gastric cardia.

References

Medical classification